is a railway station on the Kagoshima Main Line operated by Kyushu Railway Company in the Hioki, Kagoshima, Japan. The station is functioning since its opening on 1913.

Lines 
Kyushu Railway Company
Kagoshima Main Line

JR

Adjacent stations

Nearby places
Ichiuji Castle
Statue of Shimazu Yoshihiro
Ijūin Junior High School
Hioki City Library
Ijūin Station Police Box
Ijūin High School
Hioki Police Station

 Railway stations in Kagoshima Prefecture
 Railway stations in Japan opened in 1913